The Hinterer Brunnenkogel is a mountain in the Weisskamm group of the Ötztal Alps. Its summit can be reached with the highest aerial tramway in Austria.

External links
The new Wildspitzbahn

Mountains of Tyrol (state)
Mountains of the Alps
Alpine three-thousanders
Ötztal Alps